Copaxa denhezi is a species of moth in the Saturniidae family. It was first described in 1971 by Claude Lemaire and is found in Colombia.

References

Insects described in 1971
Saturniinae